The Bridges Act 1670 (22 Car 2 c 12) was an Act of the Parliament of England.

The whole Act was repealed by section 1(1) of, and Part VI of Schedule 1 to, the Statute Law (Repeals) Act 1973.

See also
Bridges Act

References
Halsbury's Statutes,

Acts of the Parliament of England
1670 in law
1670 in England
Bridges in England